Jenner is a hamlet in southern Alberta, Canada within Special Area No. 2. Previously an incorporated community, Jenner dissolved from village status on June 25, 1943.

Climate
Jenner has a semi-arid, continental climate (Köppen climate classification BSk), with cold, dry winters and warm to hot summers.

Demographics 
The population of Jenner according to Alberta Transportation's Basic Municipal Transportation Grant funding program is 15.

Notable people 
Landon Liboiron, actor

See also 
List of communities in Alberta
List of former urban municipalities in Alberta
List of hamlets in Alberta

References 

Hamlets in Alberta
Former villages in Alberta
Special Area No. 2